Robert Stevenson (born 7 December 1968) is a Canadian equestrian. He competed in two events at the 1992 Summer Olympics.

References

External links
 

1968 births
Living people
Canadian male equestrians
Olympic equestrians of Canada
Equestrians at the 1992 Summer Olympics
Sportspeople from Fredericton